The Concepción River (or just Concepción) is a river in Chiapas, Mexico.

Other rivers
There is also a Rio Concepción in Sonora, Mexico (30.528027, -112.98392).

See also
List of longest rivers of Mexico
List of rivers of Mexico

References

The Prentice Hall American World Atlas, 1984.
Rand McNally, The New International Atlas, 1993.

Rivers of Mexico